Life of the Infamous: The Best of Mobb Deep is the greatest hits album from Queensbridge rap duo Mobb Deep. It contains songs dating back to their 1993 debut album, Juvenile Hell, through their 2004 album, Amerikaz Nightmare. No Blood Money songs are on the album since those tracks are owned by Universal Music Group, not Sony Music Entertainment, the label that released this album. The disc includes "Blood Money" and "Go Head," two previously unreleased tracks. "Keep It Thoro" is the only song featured on a non-Mobb Deep album (Prodigy's H.N.I.C.).

Track listing

Charts

References

2006 greatest hits albums
Mobb Deep albums
Gangsta rap compilation albums